Aleksei or Aleksey Kuznetsov may refer to:

Aleksey Kuznetsov (footballer) (born 1996), Russian footballer
Aleksey Kuznetsov (guitarist) (born 1941), Russian guitarist
Aleksey Kuznetsov (skier) (1929–2003), Russian skier
Aleksey Kuznetsov (swimmer) (born 1968), Russian swimmer
Alexey Kuznetsov (1905–1950), Soviet statesman
Alexey Kuznetsov (field athlete) (born 1981), Paralympian athlete from Russia 
Alexey Yakovlevich Kuznetsov (1910–1969), Soviet engineer
Aleksey Igorevich Kuznetsov (born 1983), Kazakhstani ice hockey goaltender